Lowery Glacier is a glacier about  long, which flows north from Prince Andrew Plateau, Antarctica, along the east side of the Queen Elizabeth Range to enter Nimrod Glacier. It was named by the New Zealand Geological and Topographical Survey Expedition (1959–60) for J.H. Lowery who, as a member of a field party, suffered injuries when a Sno-cat broke through a crevasse bridge off Cape Selborne in November 1959.

References

Glaciers of the Ross Dependency
Shackleton Coast